William Twigge  (1657–1727) was an Anglican priest in Ireland in the late 17th and early 18th centuries.

Ladyman was born in Carrickfergus and educated at Trinity College Dublin. He was a prebendary of Limerick Cathedral from 1695 to 1705. In 1699 he became Chancellor of Killaloe  and in 1705  Archdeacon of Limerick holding both positions until his death until his death.

References

Archdeacons of Limerick
Alumni of Corpus Christi College, Oxford
18th-century Irish Anglican priests
1657 births
1727 deaths
People from County Antrim